Rivoli Township is located in Mercer County, Illinois. As of the 2010 census, its population was 1,142 and it contained 516 housing units.  Rivoli Township changed its name from North Pope Township sometime before 1921.

Geography

Demographics

Notable people
 Juanita Breckenridge Bates, born in Hopewell, Rivoli Township in 1860.
 Alson Streeter (1823-1901), politician and third-party presidential candidate. He resided in Rivoli Township and represented the township on the Mercer County Board of Supervisors.

References

External links
City-data.com
Illinois State Archives

Townships in Mercer County, Illinois
Townships in Illinois